Mark Anthony Carrier III (born April 28, 1968) is an American former football player who was a safety in the National Football League (NFL). He was the former defensive backs' coach for the Cincinnati Bengals.

Early life
Carrier went to Long Beach Polytechnic High School and was a letterman in football. In football, he was a three-year varsity starter.  Mark was named to the Parade All-American, USA Today All-American, and the Long Beach Press-Telegrams Best-in-the-West teams in 1985.  Mark Carrier is the nephew of Créole fiddle player Bébé Carriere of the Carriere Brothers and The Lawtell Playboys and cousin to Creole fiddler Calvin Carriere.

College career
Carrier is a 1989 graduate of the University of Southern California. As a junior in 1989, Carrier was named to the Playboy All-American team and became USC's first winner of the Jim Thorpe Award, presented annually to the nation's best defensive back. A two-time consensus first-team All-American, Carrier had seven interceptions in 1989, plus 107 tackles, three fumble recoveries and ten pass deflections. A three-year starter for the Trojans, Carrier finished his collegiate career with thirteen interceptions. Carrier was inducted into the USC Athletic Hall of Fame, class of 2006.

Professional career
He was selected with the sixth pick of the 1990 NFL Draft by the Chicago Bears. Carrier lined up at free safety and won Defensive Rookie of the Year in 1990, after he led the NFL with 10 interceptions, which also set the Bears record for most interceptions in a season. Carrier has also been fined for several of his hits, and also suffered three concussions during his career. Carrier played for the Bears from 1990 to 1996, the Detroit Lions (1997–99) and Washington Redskins until 2000.  Carrier was known as a smart player, often leading the defense. He played in three Pro Bowls, in 1990, 1991 and 1993.

Career statistics

Coaching career
From 2004 to 2005, Carrier was defensive backs coach at Arizona State University.

In 2006, the Baltimore Ravens hired Carrier as secondary defense coach.

In 2010, he was hired by the New York Jets as defensive line coach.

On February 13, 2012, he was hired by the Cincinnati Bengals as defensive backs coach. He was fired in 2016.

Since 2016 Carrier has worked for Sports USA Radio Network as a color analyst for NFL and college football.

References

External links
 Cincinnati Bengals bio

1968 births
Living people
All-American college football players
American football safeties
Arizona State Sun Devils football coaches
Baltimore Ravens coaches
Chicago Bears players
Cincinnati Bengals coaches
College football announcers
Detroit Lions players
National Conference Pro Bowl players
National Football League announcers
National Football League Defensive Rookie of the Year Award winners
New York Jets coaches
Sportspeople from Lake Charles, Louisiana
USC Trojans football players
Washington Redskins players
Long Beach Polytechnic High School alumni
Brian Piccolo Award winners